Oste is a river in northern Lower Saxony, Germany with a length of . It is a left tributary of the Elbe.

The Oste flows through the districts of Harburg, Rotenburg, Stade and Cuxhaven and empties into the Elbe river near Otterndorf. Tributaries are Ramme, Aue, Twiste, Bade, Bever and Mehe.

The Oste is part of the Deutsche Fährstraße, an institution similar to the American National Scenic Byways. It connects various places between Bremervörde and Kiel with relation to the history of ferries and crossing of rivers, like the historic transporter bridges in Rendsburg and Osten. Also at the Oste there are two pram ferries in Gräpel and Brobergen. The ferry in Gräpel is actually manually operated.

Although recognized as an official waterway the Oste does not have much shipping traffic.

The river has its source near Tostedt at the border of the Lüneburg Heath, flowing to the west passing Sittensen and Zeven, changing direction to north and passing Bremervörde, where influence of the tides is starting, Hemmoor and Neuhaus.

See also 
List of rivers of Lower Saxony

References 

 August Heinrich von Brook (Hrsg.): Die Oste. Lebensader zwischen Elbe und Weser. Aufsatzsammlung. Heimatbund der , Bremerhaven 2003. 
 Willi Klenck: Heimatkunde des ehemaligen Kreises Neuhaus. Pockwitz, Stade 1957, Otterndorf 1986 (Faks.).
 Gisela Tiedemann, Jochen Bölsche: Über die Oste - Geschichten aus 100 Jahren Schwebefähre Osten - Hemmoor. Drochtersen 2009,

External links 

 Osteticker (in German)
 Deutsche Fährstraße  (in German)
 Erlebnis Schwebefähre  (in German)

 
Rivers of Lower Saxony
Rivers of Germany